Marija Todorović (born 1992) is a politician in Serbia. She has served in the National Assembly of Serbia since 2020 as a member of the Serbian Progressive Party.

Private life
Todorović was born in Brus, Serbia, in what was then Yugoslavia. She has a bachelor's degree in economics and is a member of the Progressive Party's municipal board in Brus.

Politician
Todorović received the ninety-sixth position on the Progressive Party's Aleksandar Vučić — For Our Children list in the 2020 parliamentary election and was elected when the list won a landslide majority with 188 mandates. She is now a member of the assembly's environmental protection committee, a deputy member of the culture and information committee and the health and family committee, the head of Serbia's parliamentary friendship group with the Philippines, and a member of the parliamentary friendship groups with China, Cyprus, Greece, Hungary, Japan, Norway, Russia, Spain, Switzerland, and the United Arab Emirates.

References

1992 births
Living people
People from Brus
Members of the National Assembly (Serbia)
Serbian Progressive Party politicians
Women members of the National Assembly (Serbia)